Gennady Stolyarov (born 20 August 1986) is a Russian professional ice hockey right winger who currently plays for HC Meran in the Alps Hockey League.

Stolyarov was a late round selection by the Detroit Red Wings in the 2004 NHL Entry Draft. The young forward was a break-out young player during the 2006-2007 season, delivering a strong performance in the Russian Super League with HC Dynamo Moscow.   He also spent the 2007-08 season with HC Dynamo.

Career statistics

References

External links 
 

RussianProspects.com Gennadi Stolyarov Profile

1986 births
Living people
Barys Nur-Sultan players
HC CSKA Moscow players
Detroit Red Wings draft picks
Dinamo Riga players
Russian ice hockey right wingers
HC Dynamo Moscow players
HC MVD players
HC Neftekhimik Nizhnekamsk players
Severstal Cherepovets players
HC Spartak Moscow players
Torpedo Nizhny Novgorod players
HC Vityaz players